USCGC Tahoma (WMEC-908) is a United States Coast Guard medium endurance cutter. Her keel was laid on June 28, 1983 at Robert Derecktor Shipyard Incorporated, Middletown, Rhode Island. She was delivered August 12, 1987 and commissioned April 6, 1988. She is the third cutter to bear the name Tahoma, which is the Northwest Pacific Indian word that refers to the Cascade Range mountain peak now known as Mount Rainier. Her nickname, Mighty T, was selected because it was the nickname of her predecessor, Tahoma (WPG-80), during World War II.

On 13 January 2010, the Tahoma was ordered to assist in the humanitarian relief efforts following the 2010 Haiti earthquake.

During the afternoon of 16 January 2010 a boy was born on board to a Haitian woman while it was transporting wounded survivors from Port-au-Prince to the still-functional medical facilities of Cap-Haïtien, to the north.

In March 2018 the Tahoma intercepted 201 Haitian undocumented immigrants, in Bahamanian waters.

References

External links

Tahoma home page

Ships of the United States Coast Guard
Famous-class cutters
2010 Haiti earthquake relief
1987 ships